Ján Kapko  (born 13 September 1960) is a former Slovak footballer who played for DAC Dunajská Streda, Jednota Trenčín and Dukla Prague.

Club career
Kapko mostly played for DAC Dunajská Streda. He played in this club for 8 years.

International career
Kapko made three appearances for the full Czechoslovakia national football team.

References

External links
 

1960 births
Czechoslovak footballers
Slovak footballers
Czechoslovakia international footballers
Dukla Prague footballers
TTS Trenčín players
FC DAC 1904 Dunajská Streda players
Living people
Association football defenders